The 1920 United States presidential election in Arkansas took place on November 2, 1920, as part of the 1920 United States presidential election in which all 48 states participated. State voters chose nine electors to represent them in the Electoral College via a popular vote pitting Democratic nominee James M. Cox and his running mate, Assistant Secretary of the Navy Franklin Roosevelt, against Republican challenger U.S. Senator Warren G. Harding and his running mate, Governor Calvin Coolidge.

Background
Except for the Unionist Ozark counties of Newton and Searcy where Republicans controlled local government, Arkansas since the end of Reconstruction had been a classic one-party Democratic “Solid South” state. Disfranchisement during the 1890s of effectively all blacks and most poor whites had meant that outside those two aberrant counties, the Republican Party was completely moribund and Democratic primaries the only competitive elections. Although the northwest of the state was to develop a strong Socialist Party movement that served as a swing vote in county elections, political repression and internal party divisions diminished that party's strength substantially.

The Democratic Party, under the influence of future federal Senate Minority and Majority Leader Joseph Taylor Robinson and demagogic Governor and Senator Jeff Davis, was to make many familiar progressive changes in railroad regulation and child labor, but under the administration of George W. Donaghey – who saw his administration and Democratic primary candidacy as a fight against the “Davis Machine” – more rapid development occurred, especially in abolishing convict leasing and improving bank regulation.

The aftermath of World War I, however, made for a temporary turn in Arkansas voter allegiances. The League of Nations was deeply unpopular in the isolationist and fundamentalist Ozark region, and outgoing President Woodrow Wilson was thus stigmatised for his advocacy of that organisation. New Democratic nominee James M. Cox also supported American participation in the League, whereas his rival Warren Harding was largely opposed to the League and was helped in the South by racial and labor unrest elsewhere in the country.

Despite this, the solid Democratic majority of Arkansas was always conceded by polls across the nation at the end of October, even as the possibility of Harding breaking the “Solid South” was seen in Tennessee and even North Carolina.

Vote
Ultimately Cox won the election in Arkansas with 58.05 percent of the vote; Harding received 39.15 percent of the vote and the only other candidate on the ballot, imprisoned Socialist Eugene Debs received the remaining 2.80 percent. Harding’s result was nonetheless a major improvement upon the mere 28 percent won by Charles Evans Hughes in 1916, and rivalled any Republican performance in the state since advent of the poll tax, although Theodore Roosevelt in 1904 had done marginally better. Harding was the first Republican to ever carry Van Buren County, the first to carry Logan County since Ulysses S. Grant in 1872, and the first Republican since Benjamin Harrison to carry Arkansas County and Lincoln County.

Results

Results by county

See also
 United States presidential elections in Arkansas

References

Arkansas
1920
1920 Arkansas elections